Kabak tatlısı (Turkish for "pumpkin dessert") is a pumpkin dessert in Turkish cuisine. It is made by cooking peeled and cut pumpkin that has had sugar sprinkled on it (candied pumpkin). Milk can also be used. The dish is topped with chopped walnuts, tahini and kaymak. It is a winter-time seasonal dessert. The texture has been described as resembling taffy.

See also
 List of desserts
 List of squash and pumpkin dishes

References

External links
YouTube video of preparation

Bulgarian desserts
Middle Eastern cuisine
Turkish desserts
Iranian desserts
Squash and pumpkin dishes